Chamberlin House may refer to:

in the United States
(by state then city)
Chamberlin House, Chicago, Illinois, a housing partition which partially comprises the University of Chicago's Burton–Judson Courts 
Clarence D. Chamberlin House, Denison, Iowa, listed on the National Register of Historic Places (NRHP) in Crawford County
Chamberlin House (Concord, New Hampshire), a shingle-style house listed on the NRHP in Merrimack County
Clarence Chamberlin House, Eau Claire, Wisconsin, listed on the NRHP in Eau Claire County
West Chester (Des Moines, Iowa) also known as Chamberlain House and Wesley Acres, on NRHP

See also
Chamberlain House (disambiguation)